The Council of National Golf Unions (CONGU), originally the British Golf Unions Joint Advisory Committee, came into existence at a conference held in York on 14 February 1924. The conference was convened by The Royal and Ancient Golf Club of St Andrews as a means of enabling the representatives of the Golf Unions of Great Britain and Ireland to formulate a definitive system of calculating Scratch Scores and to arrive at a uniform system of handicapping based on Scratch Scores.

Operation
The Consultative Committee was appointed to receive and consider schemes for calculating and allocating the Scratch Scores and adjustments to handicaps throughout Great Britain and Ireland. The Standard Scratch Score and Handicapping Scheme was prepared by the Council in 1925 and has been in operation throughout Great Britain and Ireland since 1 March 1926.

On 21 March 1960 the name was changed to the Council of National Golf Unions (CONGU) comprising representatives of The English Golf Union, The Golfing Union of Ireland, The Scottish Golf Union, The Welsh Golf Union and The Royal and Ancient Golf Club of St Andrews.

Members
England Golf – English men and women
Golfing Union of Ireland – Irish men
Irish Ladies Golf Union – Irish women
Scottish Golf – Scottish men and women
Wales Golf – Welsh men and women
The R&A – Rules of Golf Outside US and Mexico

Former members
English Golf Union – English men
English Women's Golf Association (formally the English Ladies' Golf Association) – English women
The Ladies' Golf Union
Scottish Golf Union – Scottish men
Scottish Ladies' Golf Association – Scottish women

External links

YetiDiscGolf Site

Golf associations